Sami swoi may refer to:

 Sami swoi, a Polish film from 1967
 Sami Swoi (mobile brand), a Polish mobile brand